The Brigadier General Jeremiah P. Holland Award is a unit trophy annually awarded by the United States Army to a Military Police unit. It was established in 1969 and first awarded in 1970.

History
The Brigadier General Jeremiah P. Holland Award, first issued on 26 September 1970 – the 29th anniversary of the Military Police Corps – is annually awarded to the all-around best Military Police unit of company-size or smaller in the U.S. Army. The award is considered a unit trophy as provided for in Army Regulation 600–8–22. Units are scored against several specific criteria including the unit's Army Physical Fitness Test and weapons qualification averages, unit deployments, and personnel re-enlistment totals.

The award was established with a financial endowment from its namesake, Jeremiah Holland, following his retirement from military service. The award criteria and procedures were subsequently created by Major General Karl W. Gustafson, then the Provost Marshal General of the United States. Under them, each Army Command, Army Service Component Command, Direct Reporting unit or Field Operating Agency – as well as the U.S. Army Reserve and the Army National Guard – is allowed to submit two nominations. By custom, the recipients of inferior Military Police unit trophies – including the Eagle Award (awarded to the best MP unit in Forces Command), the Thomas F. Barr Award (awarded to the best MP unit in Army Corrections Command), and others – are nominated for consideration for the Holland Award. It consists of a trophy awarded to the selected unit, and challenge coins to the unit's personnel.

Namesake
Jeremiah P. Holland is considered one of the "founding fathers" of the Military Police Corps, having entered it during the year of its establishment, in 1941. During World War II, Holland served as provost marshal of Manila, Philippines and as the U.S. Army's deputy provost marshal in Australia. He would go on to serve as deputy to the Provost Marshal General of the United States before his retirement in 1969 at the rank of brigadier general.

References

External links
 Award criteria and regulations

Awards and decorations of the United States Army